The 1984 Miami Classic was a tennis tournament played on outdoor clay courts in Miami, Florida in the United States that was part of the 1984 Virginia Slims World Championship Series. The tournament was held from April 2 through April 8, 1984. First-seeded Laura Arraya won the singles title.

Finals

Singles
 Laura Arraya defeated  Petra Huber 6–3, 6–3.
 It was Arraya's first title of the year and the second of her career.

Doubles
 Pat Medrado /  Yvonne Vermaak defeated  Kate Latham /  Janet Newberry 5–7, 6–3, 6–3.
 It was Medrado's first title of the year and the third of her career. It was Vermaak's second title of the year and the sixth of her career.

References

External links
 ITF tournament edition details

Miami Classic